Catocala invasa is a moth of the family Erebidae first described by John Henry Leech in 1900. It is found in China.

References

invasa
Moths described in 1900
Moths of Asia